Eugoa indeclaratana is a moth of the family Erebidae first described by Francis Walker in 1863. It is found on Borneo. The habitat consists of lowland forests.

References

indeclaratana
Moths described in 1863